Complement receptor of the immunoglobulin family is a protein expressed in Kupffer cells. It is a critical receptor for the phagocytosis of opsonised particles in the blood. It recognizes iC3b (inactivated C3b) deposited on microbial surfaces.

See also
 complement system
 immunoglobulin

References